Wufeng may refer to:

Places

Mainland China
Wufeng Tujia Autonomous County, county in Hubei
Wufeng Township, Hubei (五峰乡), township in Shiyan, Hubei
Wufeng Subdistrict (五凤街道), subdistrict in Gulou District, Fuzhou, Fujian

Towns
Wufeng, Yongchun County (吾锋), town in Yongchun County, Fujian
Wufeng, Wufeng County (五峰), town in and seat of Wufeng Tujia Autonomous County, Hubei
Wufeng, Jiangxi (五丰), town in Wan'an County, Jiangxi
Wufeng, Liaoning (五峰), town in Zhangwu County, Liaoning
Wufeng, Qinghai (五峰), town in Huzhu Tu Autonomous County, Qinghai

Taiwan
Wufeng, Hsinchu, town in Hsinchu County
Wufeng, Taichung, district in Taichung
WuFeng University, private university in Chiayi

Historical eras
Wufeng (五鳳, 57BC–54BC), an era name used by Emperor Xuan of Han
Wufeng (五鳳, 254–256), an era name used by Sun Liang, emperor of Eastern Wu
Wufeng (五鳳, 618–621), an era name used by Dou Jiande

See also
Wu Feng (disambiguation)